Stop and Smell the Roses is a 1974 album by Mac Davis. It peaked at No. 2 on the US country albums chart and No. 13 on the overall albums chart.

Track list

Charts

Personnel
Mac Davis - lead vocals, acoustic guitar, harmonica
Ken Ball, Travis Wammack - guitar
Leo LeBlanc - steel guitar
Jerry Bridges - bass guitar
Tim Henson - keyboards, tambourine
Roger Clark - drums
Dale Anderson, Victor Feldman - vibraphone
Eddy Manson, Tommy Morgan - harmonica
The Ron Hicklin Singers - background vocals
Sid Sharp Strings - strings
Jimmie Haskell - string arrangements
Technical
Gary Klein - producer on "Stop and Smell the Roses"
Al Cartee, Larry Hamby, Rick Hall - engineer
Ed Caraeff - cover photography

References

1974 albums
Mac Davis albums
Albums arranged by Jimmie Haskell
Albums produced by Gary Klein (producer)
Columbia Records albums